Erick Marcus dos Santos Oliveira do Carmo (born 1 March 2004) is a Brazilian footballer who plays as a winger for Vasco da Gama.

Club career
Born in Jacarepaguá, Erick Marcus joined the academy of Vasco da Gama in 2016. He signed his first professional contract with the club in January 2023. The following month, having already made his debut in the Campeonato Carioca, he scored his first goal for Vasco da Gama, in a 4–0 Copa do Brasil win over Trem.

International career
Erick Marcus has represented Brazil at under-20 level.

Career statistics

Club

References

2004 births
Living people
Sportspeople from Rio de Janeiro (state)
Brazilian footballers
Brazil youth international footballers
Association football forwards
CR Vasco da Gama players